James Merrill Safford (1822–1907) was an American geologist, chemist and university professor.

Biography

Early life
James M. Safford was born in Putnam, Ohio on August 13, 1822. He received an M.D. and a PhD. He was trained as a chemist at Yale University.

He married Catherine K. Owens in 1859, and they had two children.

Career
Safford taught at Cumberland University in Lebanon, Tennessee from 1848 to 1873. He served as a Professor of Mineralogy, Botany, and Economical Geology at Vanderbilt University in Nashville, Tennessee from 1875 to 1900. He was a Presbyterian, and often started his lessons with a prayer.

He served on the Tennessee Board of Health. Additionally, he acted as a chemist for the Tennessee Bureau of Agriculture in the 1870s and 1880s.

He published fifty-four books, reports, and maps.

Death
He died in Dallas on July 2, 1907.

Bibliography
James M. Safford, The Silurian basin of Middle Tennessee, with notices of the strata surrounding it. (New Haven, Printed by B.L. Hamlen, 1851).
James M. Safford, A geological report of the coal and oil lands in Kentucky (Louisville, Kentucky: J.P. Morton & co., 1865).
James M. Safford, Geology of Tennessee (Nashville, Tennessee: S. C. Mercer, 1869.).
James M. Safford and Joseph Buckner Killebrew, The elements of the geology of Tennessee. Prepared for the use of the school of Tennessee, and for all persons seeking a knowledge of the resources of the state. (Nashville, Tennessee: Foster & Webb, 1900).

References

1822 births
1907 deaths
19th-century American chemists
19th-century American geologists
Cumberland University faculty
Vanderbilt University faculty
American Presbyterians
Yale University alumni
Scientists from Tennessee
19th-century American businesspeople